Harold Joseph Wheatley (born 9 May 1920) was an English footballer who played for Port Vale and Shrewsbury Town.

Career
Wheatley played for Ellesmere Port Town before joining Port Vale as an amateur in March 1938, and signing as a professional player the following month. He made his debut in a 1–0 defeat at Clapton Orient on 8 September 1938, but only played one more Third Division South game before World War II brought on the cancellation of football and the onset of the war leagues. He played two league and two cup games during the war and also guested for old club Ellesmere Port when Port Vale shut down due to war strains. He returned to Vale in the summer of 1944 as they commenced regular football, only playing the odd game as he also guested for Wrexham, Stockport County and Chester. He was transferred to Shrewsbury Town in the summer of 1946. He made 182 appearances in the Midland League and played in Salop's first seven Football League matches.

Career statistics
Source:

References

People from Eastham, Merseyside
English footballers
Association football forwards
Port Vale F.C. players
Wrexham F.C. wartime guest players
Stockport County F.C. wartime guest players
Chester City F.C. wartime guest players
Shrewsbury Town F.C. players
English Football League players
Midland Football League players
1920 births
Year of death missing